Kopperå is a village in the municipality of Meråker in Trøndelag county, Norway. The Meråker Line railway runs through the village and stops at the Kopperå Station. The local Kopperå Chapel sits on the northwest edge of the village.

Manufacturing

Kopperå had one of the best microsilica factories, Elkem Meraaker, a member of the Elkem Group. Elkem Meraaker (originally Meraaker Smelteverk) started to manufacture carbide in 1898, and was later re-built to manufacture microsilica. But in 2005 the company made the decision to end microsilica manufacturing. The factory ceased operations in summer 2006 and the buildings were taken down by 2008.

References

Villages in Trøndelag
Meråker